Emory Hale is a former American football coach. He served as the head football coach at Austin Peay State University from 1981 to 1987, compiling a record of 33–42.

Head coaching record

References

Year of birth missing (living people)
Living people
Austin Peay Governors football coaches
East Tennessee State Buccaneers football coaches
High school football coaches in Tennessee
East Tennessee State University alumni
People from Johnson City, Tennessee
Coaches of American football from Tennessee